"Cneoridium dumosum (Nuttall) Hooker F. Collected March 26, 1960, at an Elevation of about 1450 Meters on Cerro Quemazón, 15 Miles South of Bahía de Los Angeles, Baja California, México, Apparently for a Southeastward Range Extension of Some 140 Miles" is a humorous (or parody), yet factual, scientific paper by American botanist Reid Moran of the San Diego Natural History Museum.

Contents 
The paper is about the plant species Cneoridium dumosum.

Bookended by its lengthy, pangrammatic title, containing all of Moran's key points, and its copious acknowledgements, the full text of the article body is:

comprising just five words, the parenthetical reference number of the specimen collected, and a period.

Moran's closing acknowledgement:

was also used by biologist George Yatskievych, duly cited, in 1982.

In an obituary to Moran, published by The San Diego Union-Tribune, fellow botanist Tom Oberbauer noted that Moran "had a dry sense of humor".

Publishing 
The paper was published in 1962 in volume 16, page 272, of the California Botanical Society's journal Madroño. The entire paper was republished under the heading "Reprinted Classic Madroño Articles" in Madroño, volume 60, p. 359 in 2013, the California Botanical Society's centennial year.

The paper is not the shortest ever published. John H. Conway and Alexander Soifer's 2003 paper "Can n2+ 1 unit equilateral triangles cover an equilateral triangle of side > n, say n + ε?" contains just two words, "n2+2 can", followed by two figures. Even shorter is “Chemiefreie Haushaltsprodukte” (German for "Chemical-free household products"), which has zero words beyond the abstract.

References

External links 
 Full text of the article, including acknowledgements

1962 documents
Botany in North America
Humour in science
Biology papers
Flora of Baja California